The Yale Herald is a newspaper run by undergraduate students at Yale University since 1986. A weekly, the paper aims to provide in-depth, investigative reporting, and includes personal essays, interviews, opinion pieces, culture articles, reviews, and feature coverage of campus and local events. The paper has a circulation of about 3,000 and is distributed free of charge throughout the Yale campus.

Notable alumni

Journalists 
Anne Barnard: Beirut bureau chief, The New York Times 
Joshua Benton: director, Nieman Journalism Lab at Harvard University
Carl Bialik: reporter, FiveThirtyEight
Kevin Delaney: editor-in-chief, Quartz
Ben Greenman: novelist, staffer at The New Yorker
Ed Park: senior editor of Amazon Publishing's Little A literary fiction imprint
Bradley Peniston: editor, Armed Forces Journal
Tiffany Pham: founder, Mogul
Nathaniel Rich: senior editor, The Paris Review
Ben Smith: journalist, The New York Times; former editor-in-chief, BuzzFeed News
Jyoti Thottam: Op-Eds business and economics editor, The New York Times; former South Asia bureau chief, Time
Jon Wertheim: covers sports for Sports Illustrated, 60 Minutes, and the Tennis Channel.
Jessica Winter: arts editor, Time

Other 
Peter Beinart: senior fellow, Council on Foreign Relations
Andrew J. Gerber: Medical Director/CEO, Austen Riggs Center
Michael Gerber, founder, The American Bystander
John Hodgman: author, humorist, The Daily Show correspondent
Stephen Lange Ranzini: president/CEO, University Bank
Demetri Martin: humorist, actor
Matt Matros: professional poker player
Greg Pak: filmmaker, Marvel Comics writer
Jill Savitt: executive director, Dream for Darfur
Josh Shelov: director of original programming, NBC Sports
Allison Silverman: executive producer, The Colbert Report

References

External links
The Yale Herald online

Yale University publications
Student newspapers published in Connecticut